Cracked may refer to:

Television
 Cracked (British TV series), a 2008 British comedy-drama television series that aired on STV
 Cracked (Canadian TV series), a 2013 Canadian crime drama series that aired on CBC
 "Cracked", a Season 8 (2010) episode of NCIS

Other media
 Cracked (magazine), American humor magazine that ran from 1958 to 2007
 Cracked.com, American humor web site, launched in 2005, associated with Cracked magazine 
 Crack'ed, a 1987 video game
 "Cracked", a 2015 song by Pentatonix from Pentatonix

See also
Crack (disambiguation)
Cracking (disambiguation)